Na Žerinjah is a novel by Slovenian author Janko Kersnik. It was first published in 1876.

See also
List of Slovenian novels

Slovenian novels
1876 novels